Reo Revaldo Griffiths (born 27 June 2000) is an English professional footballer who plays as a forward for Yeovil Town on loan from League Two side Doncaster Rovers.

Club career
Griffiths started his career with Tottenham Hotspur, scoring 33 goals for the club's under–18 side in the 2017–18 season. In the summer of 2018, refusing to sign professional with Tottenham, he was courted by many clubs, such as RB Leipzig, Real Madrid, Barcelona and PSG. On 1 August 2018, he signed a four-year contract in with Lyon on a four-year deal. He spent three-and-a-half years with Lyon, largely playing for the club's B team in the Championnat National 2.

On 31 January 2022, Griffiths signed for League One side Doncaster Rovers for an undisclosed fee, in a two-and-a-half year deal. A day later, he made his professional debut as a second-half substitute in a 5–0 loss to Rotherham United.

On 6 March 2023, Griffiths joined National League side Yeovil Town on loan until the end of the season.

International career
In May 2017, Griffiths made his debut for England U17 as a late substitute in a 3–1 win over Norway U17.

References

External links
 
 
 

2000 births
Living people
People from Highgate
English footballers
Association football forwards
England youth international footballers
Tottenham Hotspur F.C. players
Olympique Lyonnais players
Championnat National 2 players
English Football League players
National League (English football) players
Doncaster Rovers F.C. players
Yeovil Town F.C. players
English expatriate footballers
English expatriate sportspeople in France
Expatriate footballers in France
Black British sportspeople